"Every Little Honky Tonk Bar" is a song co-written and recorded by American country music artist George Strait. It was released February 11, 2019, as the lead-off single from his 30th studio album Honky Tonk Time Machine.

Content
Strait co-wrote the song with his son Bubba Strait and longtime collaborator Dean Dillon, which was written "during a late-night session and was inspired by Bubba's tongue-twisting opening line, 'Whiskey is the gasoline that lights the fire that burns the bridge.'" He debuted the song for the first time with a live performance in December 2018 at a show in Las Vegas, Nevada.

Music video
A music video premiered in May 2019, consisting of live footage of the singer performing the song on tour. It was Strait's first single to receive an official music video in a decade, since 2009's "Living for the Night".

Chart performance
"Every Little Honky Tonk Bar" reached a peak of number 17 on the Billboard Country Airplay, making it Strait's first top 20 hit on the chart since 2013's "I Got a Car". It also peaked at number 20 on the Billboard Hot Country Songs chart.

Charts

Weekly charts

Year-end charts

Certifications

References

2019 singles
George Strait songs
Songs written by George Strait
Songs written by Dean Dillon
Song recordings produced by Chuck Ainlay
MCA Nashville Records singles
2019 songs